The Gördes Dam is a concrete-face rock-fill dam on the Gördes River located  northeast of Gölmarmara in Manisa Province, Turkey. It was constructed between 1998 and 2009 by the Turkish State Hydraulic Works. The primary purpose of the dam is water supply. It provides drinking water for the city of Manisa while also irrigating .

See also
List of dams and reservoirs in Turkey

References

Dams in Manisa Province
Concrete-face rock-fill dams
Dams completed in 2009